Biochemical recurrence is a rise in the blood level of prostate-specific antigen (PSA) in prostate cancer patients after treatment with surgery or radiation. Biochemical recurrence may occur in patients who do not have symptoms. It may mean that the cancer has come back. Also called PSA failure and biochemical relapse.

It is used to detect metastatic progression of the prostate cancer.

References

Further reading
 Guidelines:Prostate cancer/Management/Locally advanced and metastatic/Biochemical relapse alternative causes, and implications for treatment
 Defining Biochemical Recurrence of Prostate Cancer After Radical Prostatectomy: A Proposal for a Standardized Definition 10 definitions compared.

External links 
 Biochemical recurrence entry in the public domain NCI Dictionary of Cancer Terms

Oncology